Season 2010–11 for Hibernian was their 12th consecutive season of play in the Scottish Premier League. It was the first season played in the redeveloped Easter Road stadium, with its capacity increased to over 20,000 for the first time since it became an all-seater stadium in the early 1990s. The SPL season began on 15 August 2010 with a 3–2 win at Motherwell. Hibs competed in the UEFA Europa League, losing 6–2 on aggregate to Slovenian club NK Maribor. They also lost at the first stage of competition in the Scottish League Cup, losing 3–1 at Kilmarnock. Those cup defeats and a poor start to the league season led to manager John Hughes leaving by mutual consent in early October. Colin Calderwood was appointed as the new manager, but struggled to make any sort of impression, as they were knocked out of the Scottish Cup by Ayr United and fell into a relegation battle. A winning streak after the January transfer window meant any danger was quickly averted, but the team still finished in the bottom six.

Friendlies 

The Edinburgh Evening News reported on 15 May that John Hughes was waiting to see which round Hibs will enter the UEFA Europa League at before finalising his preseason schedule. Dundee United's win in the 2010 Scottish Cup Final confirmed that Hibs will enter in the third qualifying round. Hibs arranged domestic fixtures against Dunfermline Athletic and Queen of the South, a four-game tour of the Netherlands, and visits to Carlisle United and Blackpool either side of their European tie.

A postponement of a league match against Celtic, due to their opponent's cup commitments, meant that Hibs were faced with a four-week gap between competitive fixtures. Hibs arranged a friendly against Irish club Bohemians on 21 March to partly fill that gap.

Fixtures

Scottish Premier League 

The Edinburgh Evening News reported on 13 May that Hibs had requested to begin the 2010–11 league season with an away fixture due to the redevelopment of Easter Road.

The fixture list for the first 33 SPL matches in the 2010–11 season was announced on 17 June. Hibs were drawn to play against Motherwell at Fir Park, where the two clubs shared a remarkable 6–6 draw near the end of the previous season. This game was another high-scoring affair, with Hibs coming from behind to win 3–2. Hibs lost their first home league game of the season, a controversial 3–0 defeat by defending champions Rangers in which both sides had a man sent off. The Daily Record newspaper reported that this meant that Hibs were on the worst run of home form in their history, having lost the last four home games of the previous season and the first two of the new season. Further poor results extended the home winless run, but John Hughes claimed that the club's supporters expectations were too high. Defeats by Celtic and St Johnstone left Hibs without a victory since opening day. Cup defeats by NK Maribor and Kilmarnock and that poor start to the league season led to Hughes leaving the club by mutual consent in early October.

First team coach Gareth Evans and Under-19 coach Alistair Stevenson were put in caretaker charge after Hughes and Brian Rice left the club. Hibs conceded an early goal in their first match in charge, but won 2–1 against Kilmarnock thanks to two goals by captain Chris Hogg. Colin Calderwood was appointed as the new manager, but the team suffered a 4–2 defeat at Aberdeen in his first match in charge. BBC Sport reported that the match showed that Calderwood had "plenty of work to do". Hibs then showed inconsistent form under Calderwood, as defeats by Dundee United and Hearts were followed by wins against Rangers and Motherwell. Defensive problems appeared to have been cured in those two performances, but they were followed by a 4–2 defeat by Inverness that exposed many of the old flaws.

Further poor results, particularly a 2–1 home defeat by Aberdeen, led Calderwood to admit that Hibs were in a relegation battle. Calderwood noted the team's inconsistency, as none of their league wins as of 27 December had been earned against clubs in the bottom half of the league at that time. A run of five consecutive defeats, culminating in a 3–0 defeat at Tannadice, left Hibs just two points ahead of last-placed Hamilton. Indeed, Hibs had gone seven games without even scoring a goal. Consecutive home wins against St Mirren and Kilmarnock eased the pressure somewhat. Further wins against St Mirren and Inverness put Hibs in contention for a top six finish, but a defeat at Celtic Park ended such hopes. This meant that Hibs had failed to finish in the top half for the first time in seven seasons.

Fixtures

Final table

UEFA Europa League 

Having finished fourth in the 2009–10 Scottish Premier League, Hibs qualified for the 2010–11 UEFA Europa League competition. Dundee United's 3–0 victory against Ross County in the 2010 Scottish Cup Final meant that Hibs would enter in the third qualifying round, while Sevilla's victory in the 2010 Copa del Rey Final meant that Hibs would be seeded in that round. They were drawn against Slovenian club Maribor, who defeated Hungarian club Videoton in order to meet Hibs. The team's preparations were disrupted by the non-appearance of Sol Bamba on a pre-season tour.

John Hughes chose to leave Anthony Stokes and Derek Riordan out of the starting lineup for the first leg in Maribor, playing Colin Nish as a lone striker instead. Hibs crashed to a 3–0 defeat, with Stokes and Riordan only coming on as substitutes after the score was already 3–0, but they could not reduce the deficit. Stokes, Riordan and Bamba were recalled for the second leg at Easter Road, but Hibs lost 3–2 on the night and 6–2 on aggregate. The Scotsman commented that the tie had provided "little evidence" that Hibs had overcome a decline in form evident during the second half of the previous season.

Hibs' elimination was part of a season of failure for Scottish clubs in European competition, as Celtic, Dundee United and Motherwell were all eliminated in the following round. Mark McGhee and Walter Smith cited the lack of finance available to Scottish clubs, particularly outside the Old Firm, as being the root cause.

Fixtures

Summary 

|}

Scottish Cup 

Hibs entered the Scottish Cup in the fourth round, and were drawn against Ayr United. The match at Easter Road ended in a goalless draw, with goalkeeper Mark Brown to thank for producing a great save to keep the club in the cup. Hibs lost 1–0 at Somerset Park to exit the competition, meaning that new manager Colin Calderwood had won just two of his first fourteen matches. The defeat prompted speculation that Calderwood had offered to resign his position, which was denied.

Fixtures

Scottish League Cup 

Having qualified for European competition in the previous season, Hibernian entered the Scottish League Cup at the third round stage. In the draw, Hibs were given one of the two all-SPL ties to be drawn, away to Kilmarnock. A poor start to the SPL season put pressure on Hibs going into the tie. That pressure was increased by a 3–1 defeat, which meant that Hibs had won just four times in their previous 26 matches.

Fixtures

Transfers 

Hibs' first significant move in the close season was to release four first team players, goalkeeper Yves Ma-Kalambay, defender Darren McCormack, midfielder Patrick Cregg and forward Abdessalam Benjelloun. Alan Gow also left the club, returning to Plymouth Argyle at the end of his loan spell. The Edinburgh Evening News commented that these departures had comes as "little surprise". Hibs made their first signing of the summer when Netherlands B player Edwin de Graaf was signed on a free transfer from Eredivisie club NAC Breda.

After signing defenders David Stephens and Michael Hart, John Hughes commented that he would now look to sign a forward. He did this towards the end of the window by signing Darryl Duffy on loan, but this appeared to be in anticipation of selling Anthony Stokes to Celtic. Hibs sold Stokes, their top goalscorer in the previous season, for a reported fee of £1.2M. An injury to Duffy soon afterwards again left Hughes looking to sign a forward, which led in part to the signing of trialist Valdas Trakys.

At the start of the January 2011 transfer window, Sol Bamba was sold to Leicester City for an undisclosed fee. Poor results, including the Scottish Cup defeat by Ayr United, prompted chairman Rod Petrie to make a public statement in which he pledged to improve the playing squad. Within a week of that statement, Hibs signed three players on the same day: Martin Scott, Matt Thornhill and Richie Towell.

Players in

Players out

Loans in

Loans out

Player stats 

During the 2010–11 season, Hibs used 37 different players in competitive games. The table below shows the number of appearances and goals scored by each player.

|}

See also
List of Hibernian F.C. seasons

References

External links
 2010–11 Hibernian F.C. season at ESPN

Hibernian F.C. seasons
Hibernian
Hibernian